The Sluts is a 2004 novel by American author Dennis Cooper. It is about an online community discussing Brad, a gay male sex worker, and ascertaining his identity; eventually, the online community becomes obsessed with the "Brad saga" and stories of sexual and physical violence are reported, though they are eventually found to be a ruse. The novel won the Lambda Literary Award in 2005 and the Sade Prize in 2007.

Background and publication 
Dennis Cooper is an American author whose work is largely centered on fantastical elements, sexual violence, and transgression. The violence endemic to his writing has had mixed reception; while literary critic Leora Lev praised it, writer and critic Michiko Kakutani found it problematic. 

Written during the publication of the five novels in his George Miles cycle (including Frisk), The Sluts was published in 2004.

Contents 
Set in the first few years of the twenty-first century, The Sluts is a series of postings to an online community about Brad, a gay male sex worker. His partner, Brian, is abusive, and he schedules Brad's clients to have sex with him. Online users are members to a forum about sexual desire, and they discuss their sexual excitements about castration, necrophilia, snuff, BDSM, and bugchasing. They are unable to determine the precise identity of Brad, and his physical descriptions change often; his height is unclear, and his eye color is represented in several different ways. They become obsessed with the "Brad saga" – attempts to ascertain his identity, his purported posts on the website, and the site administrator's disclosures that he knows details of Brad's life – and two men impersonate Brad and Brian in a sex show. Brad's online persona becomes replaced by Thad's, one of the impersonators, and users continue to speculate on his identity and his whereabouts; they claim he was murdered, but Zack (Brian's impersonator) leaves a farewell message saying it was all a ruse.

Reception 
The novel won the Lambda Literary Award and Sade Prize in 2005 and 2007, respectively.

Sociologist Jaime García-Iglesias writes that The Sluts is indicative of the internet changing how sexual fantasies are portrayed and realized. García-Iglesias also writes that The Sluts presents an accurate view on internet culture – specifically that its reliability is questionable – that he uses in digital ethnographic work. Scholar Kent L. Brintnall similarly writes, using the theory of desire in Georges Bataille's publications, that the novel plays with desire, fantasy, and mystery; for Brintnall and Bataille, desire is a product of attempting to understand others, and The Sluts evokes this concept. Porn studies researcher Steven Ruszczycky argues that the novel was representative of a shift in gay sexual culture from the twentieth to the twenty-first centuries: The widespread availability of pre-exposure prophylaxis to prevent HIV/AIDS infection allowed for gay sexual desire to move away from safe to unsafe sexual practices. 

Queer theory scholars Stephen M. Engel and Timothy S. Lyle write that the novel authentically portrays sexual desire, particularly in the sexual subcommunities it represents.

References

Citations

Bibliography

 
 
 
 
 

2004 American novels
Lambda Literary Award-winning works
Novels about prostitution
Novels about the Internet
Novels with gay themes
2000s LGBT novels
American LGBT novels
2004 LGBT-related literary works